WSUL (98.3 FM) is a commercial radio station broadcasting an adult contemporary radio format. Licensed to Monticello, New York, the station is currently owned by Vince Benedetto, through licensee Bold Gold Media Group, L.P.

History
WSUL was owned and operated by former disc jockey Dan Dayton and his wife, Lynne (Dan Communications Inc.). Pat Gillen and Dave Driscoll anchored the morning show at one time. For ten years the station played easy listening songs from the '60s and '70s until the station was sold to Reynolds Communications.  In 1988, under new owner/General Manager Bill Reynolds, the radio station developed an Adult Contemporary format called "Lite Rock" and proceeded to dominate the market. The "Lite Rock" moniker remained into the mid-1990s when the station evolved into a CHR format while continuing its market dominance. In the late 1990s the station added a translator at 95.7 FM in Middletown, New York.

In 2005, WSUL was sold to Watermark Broadcasting, Inc.  Effective November 30, 2016, Watermark sold WSUL and sister stations WVOS and WVOS-FM to Bold Gold Media Group, L.P. for $1.6 million.

On October 18, 2021, WSUL changed their format from Top 40/CHR to Adult Contemporary and added Chase Daniels as Program Director and PMD Host

References

External links
Official website

SUL
Mainstream adult contemporary radio stations in the United States